Mina for you is an album by Italian singer Mina, issued in 1969. It was recorded by Mina entirely in English.

Track listing

Side A

Side B

1969 albums
Mina (Italian singer) albums